Kangerlussuaq, is a settlement in western Greenland in the Qeqqata municipality located at the head of the fjord of the same name. It is Greenland's main air transport hub and the site of Greenland's largest commercial airport. The airport dates from American settlement during and after World War II, when the site was known as Bluie West-8 and then Sondrestrom Air Base. The Kangerlussuaq area is also home to Greenland's most diverse terrestrial fauna, including muskoxen, caribou, and gyrfalcons. The settlement's economy and population of 508 is almost entirely reliant on the airport and tourist industry.

Geography 

Kangerlussuaq occupies an alluvial flatland on the far end of the 190 km long Kangerlussuaq Fjord, straddling both sides of the Qinnguata Kuussua river estuary. East of Kangerlussuaq there is a confluence of the two major regional rivers, the Qinnguata Kuussua and Akuliarusiarsuup Kuua. The valley of the latter forms large quicksand plains. Both rivers originate from the Russell Glacier. The edge of the glacier is easily accessible and is a major tourist attraction from the town, as is the edge of the ice sheet in the Isunngua highlands to its northeast.

Highlands such as Tarajornitsut bound Kangerlussuaq from the north and south. To the southeast behind lake Tasersuatsiaq, which provides fresh water to the town, is the vast highland of Ammalortup Nunaa, the original region artificially populated with 27 muskoxen.

History

While Inuit hunters certainly visited Kangerlussuaq, there appears never to have been a settlement at the location.

Kangerlussuaq was founded at the east end of Kangerlussuaq fjord as Bluie West-8 on 7 October 1941, under the supervision of Colonel Bernt Balchen of the United States Army Air Forces (USAAF). Following the fall of Denmark to Germany in World War II, US forces assumed security for Greenland, building several bases including Bluie West-1 to the south in Narsarsuaq and Bluie West-8 at the Kangerlussuaq fjord.

The base briefly came under Danish control in 1950, but following mounting concerns about the Cold War threat, a new agreement saw the United States reopen Bluie West-8 under the name of Sondrestrom Air Base on 27 April 1951.

It served as one of the Distant Early Warning Line bases and a supply station for similar early warning facilities. Following the fall of the Soviet Union, the usefulness of the base was greatly diminished and the last U.S. Air Force personnel left the base on 30 September 1992. The base subsequently came under Greenlandic Home Rule and was renamed using the Kalaallisut dialect of the West Greenland Inuit.

This site and Bluie West-1 in Narsarsuaq remain Greenland's best-equipped airports. Almost all of the permanent structures in the town were built during the American occupation of the site.

Climate
The climate in Kangerlussuaq is subarctic (Köppen Dfc), bordering on tundra climate (Köppen ET) and unusually for somewhere this far north (In the arctic circle), a cold-semi-arid climate (Köppen BSk), with the area receiving very little rainfall.

In July 2012 a gust of warm air resulted in glacier meltwater which wiped out a key crossing of the Watson River.

Population 
The population of Kangerlussuaq dropped significantly after the liquidation of the Sondrestrom Air Base. Since then it has increased by more than 80%, although it has begun dropping again in recent years.

Transport

Air 

As the only civilian airport in Greenland large enough to support large long-range airplanes such as Boeing 747s, Kangerlussuaq Airport is Greenland's most important transport hub. Hotel Kangerlussuaq operates at the airport.

Sea 
Kangerlussuaq Fjord is navigable in its entire length. It is fairly shallow and suitable for small ships only, mainly used by supply ships of the Royal Arctic Line, and unusable in winter. Cruise ships, such as Norway's Hurtigruten, navigate the fjord, anchoring outside the port. They go to Kangerlussuaq mainly to exchange passenger by air, because the travel time to and from Greenland is too long for many passengers.

Road 

Kangerlussuaq has the largest road network outside any settlement in Greenland (not counting streets inside the settlement).

A gravel road through Isunngua connects Kangerlussuaq with the ice sheet, initially serving as venue for car endurance experiments. Since then it has been mainly used for tourist purposes.

There are plans to construct a road to Sisimiut as of 2017. The cost estimates have been between 250 and 500 million Danish kroner (DKK), depending on road quality, and therefore the plans are delayed. The drive time would be much longer than the fly time, and there are also considerations to move the main hub of Air Greenland to Nuuk Airport, closing Kangerlussuaq airport.

A road to Sisimiut with a low quality, aimed to off-road vehicles was built 2020-2021, at a cost of 25 million DKK. There are hopes that the road will be rebuilt to a proper paved road in future.

Scientific research

It was commonly known around the town as Kellyville. It was operated by SRI International for the U.S. National Science Foundation and the Danish Meteorological Institute. The facility was host to more than 20 instruments, the majority of which provide unique and complementary information about the arctic upper atmosphere. The centerpiece instrument of the facility was an L band incoherent scatter (IS) radar with a  fully steerable antenna. It was transported from Alaska to Kangerlussuaq in 1983.

References

External links

 

 
Populated places established in 1941
Populated places in Greenland
Populated places of Arctic Greenland
1941 establishments in Greenland